Yagya Bahadur Thapa is a recognised martyr of Nepal. He was given martyrdom status by the Government of Nepal in March 2016. He was born in 1917 and from Okhaldhunga district and a member of Nepali Congress in the 1970s when it was banned. Along with Bhim Narayan Shrestha, he was a leader in armed revolt in 1974 and was a leader in the banned Nepali Congress. He was implicated in a bomb attack on the King of Nepal in Biratnagar. He joined with mutineers at the eastern hill district of Okhaldunga in an attempted armed revolution. He was arrested attempting to capture Okhaldunga.

A one-man tribunal of Ridhima Nand Rajacharya sentenced Captain Yagya Bahadur Thapa and Bhim Narayan Shrestha to death. The Supreme Court of Nepal upheld the decision. In 1978 he was executed in a forest south of Hetauda.

References

Nepali Congress politicians from Koshi Province
Bagale Thapa
1917 births
1978 deaths
Deaths by firearm in Nepal
People from Okhaldhunga District
Nepalese martyrs
Members of the 2nd Nepalese Constituent Assembly